This article lists the genera of the bacteria. The currently accepted taxonomy is based on the List of Prokaryotic names with Standing in Nomenclature (LPSN) and National Center for Biotechnology Information (NCBI). However many taxonomic names are taken from the GTDB release 07-RS207 (8th April 2022).

Phyla
{| border="0" style="width: 100%;"
!
|-
|style="border:0px" valign="top"|

List